Harvey Louis "Hooks" Cotter (May 22, 1900 – August 6, 1955) was a first baseman in Major League Baseball. He played for the Chicago Cubs.

References

External links

1900 births
1955 deaths
Major League Baseball first basemen
Chicago Cubs players
Baseball players from Missouri
People from Holden, Missouri